Counsel's Opinion is a 1933 British romantic comedy film starring Henry Kendall and Binnie Barnes.  It was one of three films directed in Britain in the early 1930s by Canadian-American Allan Dwan and was an early production from Alexander Korda's London Films.  Counsel's Opinion was based on a 1931 Gilbert Wakefield play and was remade, again by London Films, in 1938 as The Divorce of Lady X starring Laurence Olivier and Merle Oberon.

Plot
Divorce barrister Logan (Kendall) arrives back in London from a trip overseas to find the whole city fogbound.  Unable to reach his flat, he books into the exclusive Royal Parks Hotel, where a costume ball is taking place.  Many of the partygoers are also stranded by the fog and while some are happy to bed down for the night in the hotel lounge, Leslie (Barnes) sweet-talks Logan into letting her stay in his suite.  Although the pair are attracted to each other, the night passes innocently with Leslie in the bedroom and Logan in the sitting-room.  As he leaves the suite for work the next morning, Logan barrels into a lady's maid in the corridor outside the room.

On arriving at chambers, Logan is asked to act as counsel for Lord Rockburn, who is seeking a divorce from his wife.  Logan accepts the brief, but then discovers to his horror that Lady Rockburn was a guest at the Royal Parks Hotel ball the previous night, and a cornerstone of the case is alleged impropriety after a maid observed a man leaving her room that morning.  Convinced that Lady Rockburn can only be Leslie, Logan tries to back out from the case, until Lord Rockburn produces his chief witness the maid, who shows no sign of recognising Logan after their brief encounter in the hotel corridor.

When Leslie calls to return a dressing gown Logan lent her, he invites her to dine with him that evening, still believing her to be Lady Rockburn and intending to inform her of the situation.  At the restaurant he lays his cards on the table and Leslie reassures him that she reciprocates his feelings.  The romantic evening comes to an abrupt end when Lord Rockburn shows up at the same restaurant accompanied by another woman, and Logan and Leslie are forced to make an unobtrusive early exit to avoid a potentially scandalous public scene.  They go back to Logan's flat, where he assures Leslie that he has fallen in love with her and will if necessary sacrifice his legal career for her.  Meanwhile, Lord Rockburn is informed that a private detective he has on the case has uncovered the identity of his wife's lover.  He decides to visit Logan immediately to tell him the good news, and is baffled by Logan's horrified reaction when he opens the door.  Logan admits him to the flat where Leslie is sitting, throwing himself on Lord Rockburn's mercy by confessing that he loves her and is prepared to face the consequences.  To his astonishment, the bewildered Lord Rockburn informs him that he has never seen Leslie before in his life.  Leslie then confesses that she has gone along with Logan's incorrect assumption as a means of seeing how much he would be prepared to give up for her.  She tells him that she is in fact a widow, and that he has passed the test with flying colours.

Cast

 Henry Kendall as Logan
 Binnie Barnes as Leslie
 Lawrence Grossmith as Lord Rockburn
 Cyril Maude as Willock
 Francis Lister as James Gowan
 Harry Tate as Taxi Driver

 C. Denier Warren as Hotel Manager
 Mary Charles as Stella Marston
 Margaret Baird as Saunders
 J. Fisher White as Judge
 Stanley Lathbury as George

Reception and later history
Surviving evidence suggests that Counsel's Opinion had a generous budget and relatively high production values for a British film of the early 1930s, with careful attention being paid to elegant and expensive-looking costuming and set design, and special permission being obtained for location filming in London's Middle Temple.  Extant reviews indicate a generally favourable critical reception.  Kine Weekly praised "clever dialogue, fine team work by an experienced cast, and good production qualities", while The Cinema appreciated "fluent direction...first-class team  work...effective backgrounds...beautiful photography, flawless recording" and suggested the film's appeal to the more sophisticated end of the market as "attractive general entertainment, especially for better-class halls".

After its original cinema run, there is no indication of the film ever having been seen again.  The British Film Institute does not hold a print in its National Archive and classes the film as "missing, believed lost".  As what would appear to have been a well-received prestige production of its day, with the involvement of names such as Korda and Dwan, Counsel's Opinion is included on the BFI's "75 Most Wanted" list of missing British feature films.

References

External links 
 
 
 
 

1933 films
1933 romantic comedy films
British romantic comedy films
British black-and-white films
1930s English-language films
British films based on plays
Films directed by Allan Dwan
London Films films
Lost British films
Films produced by Alexander Korda
Films about divorce
Films set in London
Films shot at Imperial Studios, Elstree
1930s British films